The 2014 Shanghai International Film Festival was the 17th such festival devoted to international cinema held in Shanghai, China.

International Jury
The members of the jury for the Golden Goblet Award were:

 Gong Li (Chinese actress; president of the jury)
 Im Sangsoo (South Korean director and screenwriter)
 Shunji Iwai (Japanese film director)
 Liu Jie (Chinese director)
 Peyman Moaadi (Iranian actor and director)
 Sally Potter (UK director)
 Lone Scherfig (Danish director)

Winners

 Best Feature Film: Little England
 Jury Grand Prix: The Uncle Victory
 Best Director: Pantelis Voulgaris (Little England)
 Best Actress: Pinelopi Tsilika (Little England)
 Best Actor: Vithaya Pansringarm (The Last Executioner)
 Best Screenplay: Cyril Gely and Volker Schlöndorff (Diplomacy)
 Best Cinematography: Luo Pan (The Sacred Arrow)
 Best Music: Gregg Alexander (Begin Again)

References

External links
Official website

Shanghai International Film Festival
Shanghai International Film Festival
Shanghai
Shanghai
21st century in Shanghai